Tuckertown may refer to:
Tuckertown, California, former name of Lakeport, California
Tuckertown, Kentucky
Tuckertown Reservoir

See also
Tuckerton, New Jersey
Tucker's Town, Bermuda